Events in the year 1918 in Spain.

Incumbents
Monarch: Alfonso XIII
President of the Council of Ministers: 
 until 22 March: Manuel García-Prieto, Marquis of Alhucemas
 22 March-9 November: Antonio Maura
 9 November-5 December:  Manuel García-Prieto, Marquis of Alhucemas
 starting 5 December: Álvaro de Figueroa, Count of Romanones

Births
 January 19 - José Costas Gual. (died 2011)
 February 8 - Enrique Tierno Galván. (died 1986)
 March 4 - José María Larrauri Lafuente. (died 2008)

Deaths

José Ferrándiz y Niño. (born 1847)

References

 
Years of the 20th century in Spain
1910s in Spain
Spain
Spain